Maria Josephina Arnoldina van der Hoeven (born 13 September 1949) is a retired Dutch politician of the Christian Democratic Appeal (CDA) party and nonprofit director.

Van der Hoeven attended a Lyceum in Maastricht from April 1966 until May 1969 and applied at the Open University in Heerlen in July 1970 majoring in Education obtaining a Bachelor of Education degree in June 1972. Van der Hoeven worked as a economics teacher in Maastricht from June 1969 until February 1987 and served as a education administrator for the Adult Commercial Vocational Training Centre in Maastricht from September 1981 until February 1987. Van der Hoeven served on the Municipal Council of Maastricht from April 1974 until June 1991. Van der Hoeven worked as Chairwoman of the Supervisory board of the Limburg Technology Centre from February 1987 until June 1991.

Van der Hoeven became a Member of the House of Representatives after Huib Eversdijk was elected as a Member of the Senate after the Senate election of 1991, taking office on 11 June 1991 serving as a frontbencher chairing the parliamentary committee for Education, Culture and Science and spokesperson for Education, Social Work, Culture and deputy spokesperson for the Interior, Economic Affairs, Social Affairs, Ombudsman and Equality.

After the election of 2002 Van der Hoeven was appointed as Minister of Education, Culture and Science in the Cabinet Balkenende I, taking office on 22 July 2002. The Cabinet Balkenende I fell just four months later on 16 October 2002 after tensions in the coalition over the stability of the Pim Fortuyn List (LPF) and continued to serve in a demissionary capacity. After the election of 2003 Van der Hoeven returned as a Member of the House of Representatives, taking office on 30 January 2003. Following the cabinet formation of 2003 Van der Hoeven continued as Minister of Education, Culture and Science in the Cabinet Balkenende II, taking office on 27 May 2003. The Cabinet Balkenende II fell on 30 June 2006 after the Democrats 66 (D66) had lost confidence in the functioning of Minister of Integration and Asylum Affairs Rita Verdonk and continued to serve in a demissionary capacity until it was replaced by the caretaker Cabinet Balkenende III with Van der Hoeven remaining as Minister of Education, Culture and Science, taking office on 7 July 2006. After the election of 2006 Van der Hoeven again returned as a Member of the House of Representatives, taking office on 30 November 2006. Following the cabinet formation of 2006 Van der Hoeven was appointed as Minister of Economic Affairs in the Cabinet Balkenende IV, taking office on 22 February 2007. The Cabinet Balkenende IV fell on 20 February 2010 after tensions in the coalition over the extension of the Dutch involvement in the Task Force Urozgan of the International Security Assistance Force (ISAF) in Afghanistan and continued to serve in a demissionary capacity. In May 2010 Van der Hoeven announced that she wouldn't stand for the election of 2010. Following the cabinet formation of 2010 Van der Hoeven was not giving a cabinet post in the new cabinet, the Cabinet Balkenende IV was replaced by the Cabinet Rutte I on 14 October 2010.

Biography

Early life
After completing her secondary education she trained as a primary-school teacher in Maastricht. She went on to gain a secondary teaching certificate in English, after which she attended courses in higher management for non-profit organisations at the Institute of Social Sciences and business management at the Open University in Heerlen. From 1969 she taught at home economics schools and from 1971 at a junior secondary commercial school, where she later became a school counsellor. Until 1987 she was head of the Adult Commercial Vocational Training Centre in Maastricht, after which she served as the head of the Limburg Technology Centre until 1991.

Politics

From 1985 to 1991, Van der Hoeven was a member of the municipal council of Maastricht. From 1991 to 2002, Member of the House of Representatives and Minister of Education, Culture and Science from 2002 to 2007. In 2005, she caused an uproar in a debate about the teaching of Intelligent Design in the country's schools. Van der Hoeven said that Charles Darwin's theories were incomplete and that new things had been discovered by proponents of intelligent design. The then Dutch Minister of Education later announced that she did not intend to introduce the creationist ideas into the school curricula but only wanted to confront their adherents with the supporters of the theory of evolution.

Minister of Economic Affairs from 2007 to 2010, she has held a variety of social and cultural posts, including membership of the governing board of the Domstad Primary Teacher Training College in Utrecht and the Southern Dutch Opera Association, and membership of the ‘’t Vervolg’ theatre group.

On 11 March 2011, Van der Hoeven was appointed Executive Director of the International Energy Agency. Her opponents have voiced concerns that she lacks expertise on energy matters, while her supporters point out that her work as Minister of Economic Affairs included many energy issues, and that she has extensive contacts with major OPEC members. She took over from Nobuo Tanaka on 1 September 2011. On 1 September 2015, she was succeeded by Fatih Birol.

Later career
Since October 2016, van der Hoeven has been Vice Chairwoman of the High-level Panel of the European Decarbonisation Pathways Initiative within the European Commission. In addition, she holds several board memberships.

Corporate boards
 Innogy, Member of the Supervisory Board (since 2016)
 Total S.A., Independent Member of the Board of Directors (since 2016)

Non-profit organizations
 Rocky Mountain Institute (RMI), Board de Trustees (since 2015)

Personal life
Van der Hoeven was married to Lou Buytendijk, who was diagnosed with Alzheimer's disease in 2005 and succumbed to his illness in 2012. Because of her husband's illness she is active in the Dutch Alzheimer's Foundation and currently serves as its president.

Decorations

See also

 Creation and evolution in public education
 Politics of the Netherlands
 World Energy Outlook

References

External links

Official
  M.J.A. (Maria) van der Hoeven Parlement & Politiek

 

 

1949 births
Living people
Christian Democratic Appeal politicians
Dutch bloggers
Dutch women bloggers
Dutch corporate directors
Dutch expatriates in France
Dutch lobbyists
Dutch nonprofit directors
Dutch nonprofit executives
Dutch Roman Catholics
Dutch school administrators
Intelligent design advocates
International Energy Agency officials
Members of the House of Representatives (Netherlands)
Ministers of Economic Affairs of the Netherlands
Ministers of Education of the Netherlands
Municipal councillors of Maastricht
Officers of the Order of Orange-Nassau
Officers of the Order of Saints Maurice and Lazarus
Officiers of the Légion d'honneur
Politicians from Maastricht
People from Meerssen
Women government ministers of the Netherlands
20th-century Dutch civil servants
20th-century Dutch educators
20th-century Dutch women politicians
20th-century Dutch politicians
21st-century Dutch businesspeople
21st-century Dutch civil servants
21st-century Dutch educators
21st-century Dutch women politicians
21st-century Dutch politicians